Tony Sergeant (born 6 June 1977) is a retired football midfielder who last played for Cercle Brugge in the Belgian Pro League.

Sergeant started his career at Antwerp, before moving to Zulte-Waregem in the summer of 2004. During the 2005-06 season, he scored 10 goals, before moving to Italian Serie B team AS Bari in 2007. This move was not a big success, and as a result, Sergeant went back to his home country only six months later. Cercle Brugge made a loan deal with Bari and thereafter completed a full transfer before Sergeant retired in 2012.

Honours
Zulte Waregem
Belgian Cup: 2005–06

References

Tony Sergeant player info at Cerclebrugge.be 

1977 births
Living people
Belgian footballers
People from Deinze
Association football wingers
Cercle Brugge K.S.V. players
Royal Antwerp F.C. players
S.V. Zulte Waregem players
Belgian Pro League players
S.S.C. Bari players
Serie B players
Belgian expatriate footballers
Expatriate footballers in Italy
K.M.S.K. Deinze players
Footballers from East Flanders